Naiset Point is a  mountain summit located in Mount Assiniboine Provincial Park, in the Canadian Rockies of British Columbia, Canada. Naiset Point is composed of sedimentary rock laid down during the Cambrian period. Formed in shallow seas, this sedimentary rock was pushed east and over the top of younger rock during the Laramide orogeny.

History

The mountain was named in 1913 by The Interprovincial Boundary Survey for the word naiset which translates from the First Nations word for sunset.

The first ascent of Naiset Point was made in 1920 by H.E. Bulyea, N. Allen, M. Gold, D.J. McGeary, J. Stewart, E.L. Tayler, and C.G. Wates.

The mountain's name was officially adopted in 1924 when approved by the Geographical Names Board of Canada.

Climate

Based on the Köppen climate classification, Naiset Point is located in a subarctic climate zone with cold, snowy winters, and mild summers. Temperatures can drop below −20 °C with wind chill factors below −30 °C. Precipitation runoff from Naiset Point drains into Lake Magog.

See also
 List of mountains of Canada
 Geography of British Columbia
 Geology of British Columbia

References

External links
 Naiset Point photo: Flickr
Mount Assiniboine Provincial Park

Two-thousanders of British Columbia
Canadian Rockies
Kootenay Land District